Iñigo Cervantes-Huegun was the defending champion but chose not to compete.
Andrey Kuznetsov won the title after defeating Adrian Ungur 6–3, 6–3 in the final.

Seeds

Draw

Finals

Top half

Bottom half

References
 Main Draw
 Qualifying Draw

ATP Challenger Trophy - Singles
2012 Singles